The IAR-46 is a very light two-seater airplane for flight schools, training and tourism.
Construction uses conventional riveted joints. The seats are arranged side by side, the conventional left seat being the pilot or student pilot seat. The aircraft has a low trapezoidal wing, empennage in "T" configuration, semi-retractable landing gear (mechanical), with the  tailwheel connected to the rudder.

The aircraft was certificated under JAR-VLA regulations by the Romanian Civil Aviation Authority in November 1999.

Variants
IAR 46 baseline production version
IAR 46SMore powerful  Rotax 912 S3 engine

Specifications (IAR.46)
{{Aircraft specs
|ref=Brassey's World Aircraft & Systems Directory 1999/2000, Jane's all the World's Aircraft 2004-05.'''
|prime units?=met

|genhide=

|crew=two
|capacity=
|length m=7.85
|span m=11.42
|height m=2.15
|wing area sqm=13.87
|aspect ratio=9.403:1
|airfoil=GA(W)-1
|empty weight kg=530
|gross weight kg=
|gross weight lb=
|gross weight note=
|max takeoff weight kg=750
|fuel capacity=
|more general=

|eng1 number=1
|eng1 name=Rotax 912 F3/A3
|eng1 type=4-cylinder horizontally-opposed air-cooled piston engine
|eng1 kw=58

|prop blade number=2
|prop name=Hoffmann HO-V352F/170FQ
|prop dia m=1.7
|prop dia note=variable-pitch propeller

|max speed kmh=
|cruise speed kmh=150
|cruise speed note=(econ cruise)
|stall speed kmh=78
|stall speed mph=
|stall speed kts=
|stall speed note=
|never exceed speed kmh=270
|range km=800
|range miles=
|range nmi=
|range note=(no reserve)
|ferry range km=
|ferry range miles=
|ferry range nmi=
|ferry range note=
|endurance=
|ceiling m=5000
|ceiling ft=
|ceiling note=
|g limits=+4.4, -2.2
|roll rate=
|climb rate ftmin=846
|time to altitude=
|wing loading kg/m2=54.1
|fuel consumption kg/km=
|fuel consumption lb/mi=
|power/mass=12.58 kg/kW (20.67 lb/hp)
|more performance=

|avionics=
}}

Notes

References

Jackson, Paul. Jane's All The World's Aircraft 2003–2004. Coulsdon, UK: Jane's Information Group, 2003. .
Taylor, Michael J.H. Brassey's World Aircraft & Systems Directory 1999/2000''. London:Brassey's, 1999. .

46
1990s Romanian civil trainer aircraft
Aircraft first flown in 1993
Low-wing aircraft
T-tail aircraft
Single-engined tractor aircraft